Universitas is a Latin word meaning "the whole, total, the universe, the world", or in Roman law a society or corporation; the latter sense is where the word university is derived from.

Universitas may also refer to: 

 Universitas 21, an international network of research-intensive universities
 Universitas 21 Global or U21Global, an online graduate school backed by Universitas 21
 Universitas (newspaper), a weekly student newspaper at the University of Oslo
 Universitas, Bloemfontein, a suburb of Bloemfontein, South Africa
 905 Universitas, an asteroid
 A student body, first used to describe the University of Bologna in the 11th century
 Universitas Indonesia railway station, a railway station in Depok, West Java, Indonesia
 Universitas Pancasila railway station, a railway station in Jakarta, Indonesia
 UNIVERSITAS, the Scientific Papers Authors and Publishers Society, located in Kraków, Małopolska, Poland